Epaphius amplicollis is a species of beetle in the family Carabidae. It was described by Fairmaire in 1858.

References

Beetles described in 1858